The Kitchener River is a river of in the Otago region of New Zealand. The river's source is Kitchener Glacier/Cirque, it flows east down Turnbull Thomson Falls then over Aspiring Flats to become a tributary of the Matukituki River.

See also
List of rivers of New Zealand

References

Rivers of Otago
Rivers of New Zealand